Victor Anicet (born in 1938 in Marigot, a commune in the north of Martinique) is a French visual artist and ceramist.

Biography

Training and early career 
Victor Anicet trained as a ceramist initially at the Ecole des Arts Appliqués in Fort-de-France (academy of applied arts), continuing his training at Ecoles des Métiers des Arts de Paris (school of applied arts) in the ceramics department; at graduation in 1961, he was recognised as first in his class. After obtaining certification for a preparatory class for physics and chemistry applied to ceramics at the Arts et Métiers in Paris, he undertook numerous training courses in Europe: first in France, with potters such as Yves Mohy and Jean and Jacqueline Lerat at the École des Beaux-Arts de Bourges, then in England with John Reeve and Bernard Leach, at Michael Cardew's St Ives pottery and finally with Marion Mangold in Ottweiler, in Germany.

Background and work in Martinique 
His paintings evoke Maroons as people of courage and rebellion. He creates objects that respond to Martinique and the history of the indigenous people of the island, which he explored at a young age with Rev. Pere Pinchon, co-founder of the International Association for Caribbean Archaeology and an initiator of archaeological research in Martinique. Assisting at a dig in the Adoration district in Le Marigot, Anicet learned about the ceramic culture of the Arawak by observing the fragments of pottery he was cleaning.

In 1984, he was a co-creator of the group "Fwomajé", the Creole for the kapok tree, which carries out research on Caribbean aesthetics. He has exhibited in France, the Caribbean, Germany and South Korea. In a collaboration with the Atelier Simon Marq, a studio in Reims, he created stained glass windows for the Co-Cathedral of Our Lady of Assumption, Saint-Pierre; the work was dedicated on 8 December 2006. He studied at the Petit Manoir College, located in Lamentin, Martinique, now named Lycée Polyvalent Victor Anicet.

Retrospective exhibitions 
An exhibition of works selected from across Anicet's career was included in the 34th São Paulo Art Biennial and another, Sève, was held in tribute to his career in 2021 at Tropiques Atrium, an arts venue in Fort-de-France.

Filmography 

 2009 Victor Anicet, céramiste et artiste martiniquais
 2015 La Vision du Vaincu
 2015 Dans les jardins HSE installation de l'oeuvre de V. Anicet, mai 2015
 2016 ANICET  victor Animation murale au collège CASSIEN  Sainte-Claire Martinique
 2016 ANICET MUR DU MARIN
 2017 L'oeil du lezard : Victor Anicet
 2019 Le Palais du savoir - Yohann Guglielmetti
 2020 Voeux pour 2020 de Franck Robine, Préfet de la Martinique
 2021 SETANOU - 5 February 2021 - Victor Anicet

References

External links 
 The official website of Victor Anicet
 An interview with Victor Anicet: Manioc.

Martiniquais people
1938 births
French ceramists
20th-century ceramists
21st-century ceramists
Living people
Chevaliers of the Légion d'honneur
People from Le Marigot